Sam Hanna is a character on the American television series, NCIS: Los Angeles

Sam Hanna may also refer to:
 Sam Hanna Bell, a novelist, short story writer, playwright, and broadcaster who lived in Northern Ireland.
 Sam Hanna Sr., an inductee in the Louisiana Political Museum and Hall of Fame

See also
 Samuel Hanna